The 2000 United States rugby union tour was a series of matches played in November 2000 in Wales and Scotland by United States national rugby union team.

Results
'Scores and results list United States's points tally first.

United States
United States national rugby union team tours
tour
tour
rugby
Rugby union tours of Scotland
Rugby union tours of Wales